The Palena River or Carrenleufú is a river shared by Chile and Argentina in Northern Patagonia. It drains the waters of the Vintter Lake, also shared by these nations, and it flows into the Pacific Ocean. 56.5% of the river basin lies in Chile.

This river has a regular glacial regime and rapid white waters. The rapids between Palena and Puerto Raúl Marín Balmaceda are choice kayaking white water. The volume and rapid drop in elevation of the river is ideal for hydroelectric power plants. There are several projects at both sides of the border to use this power.

Course
The river originates as the Carrenleufú as the out-flow from Lake Vintter. Its major tributaries include the Tranquilo, Figueroa, Frío, Risopatrón and Melimoyu rivers.

See also
List of rivers of Chile
List of rivers of Argentina

References

External links
Cuenca del Río Aysén
Palena River

Rivers of Argentina
Rivers of Chile
Rivers of Chubut Province
Rivers of Los Lagos Region
Rivers of Aysén Region
International rivers of South America